Tinubu Square (formerly Independence Square), is an open space landmark located in Broad Street, Lagos Island, Lagos State, Nigeria named after the Yoruba slave trader, merchant, and aristocrat Madam Efunroye Tinubu. It was formerly called Ita Tinubu before it was named Independence Square by leaders of the First Nigerian Republic after Nigerian independence and subsequently Tinubu Square.

History 

According to a historian, it was the location of the first court of justice which was replaced in 1918 by the Supreme Court or the Court of Assizes, which was a magnificent structure. The Square was the melting point of different cultures, a place where the indigenous Lagosians, those of Brazilian extract and the colonial administration met.

Structure

The square is iron-fenced with two flowing fountains, flowers and tropical trees in it. It also contains a life-size statue of Madam Tinubu on a cenotaph. The size of the square is The 2,000 square meter. The square was last remodeled in 2017 by the Lagos state government.

References

Lagos Island
Landmarks in Lagos
Squares in Lagos
Outdoor sculptures in Lagos
Monuments and memorials in Lagos
Monuments and memorials to women